Monmouth County may refer to:
 Monmouth County, New Jersey, United States
 the former name of Monmouth Land District, Tasmania, Australia
 Monmouthshire, county of Wales